The Bavarian International Tennis Championships (known since 1990 by its sponsored name BMW Open) is a men's tennis tournament held at the MTTC Iphitos in Munich, Germany. Held since 1900, the tournament is played on outdoor clay courts and is a part of the ATP Tour schedule.

History
In 1900, the first edition of the tournament was held by the tennis club Münchner Tennis- und Turnierclub (MTTC) Iphitos, which was the first tennis club in Munich having been formed in 1892 by students. The club only had grass courts, and the first edition was therefore played on grass.

The Center Court of the MTTC has been in Aumeisterweg since 1930, and holds 5,600 people.

The tournament has offered prize money since 1970, when the total prizes amounted to $20,000.

Past finals

Singles

Doubles (since 1974)

See also
 Munich WCT
 List of tennis tournaments

References

External links

Official website
ATP tournament profile

 
Tennis tournaments in Germany
Clay court tennis tournaments
Recurring sporting events established in 1900